The Waltz in A-flat major, Op. 64 No. 3, composed by Frédéric Chopin, is the final waltz by Chopin that was published in his lifetime. It was dedicated to Countess Katarzyna Branicka. The waltz is in A-flat major and features a central section in C major.

References

External links 
 

Waltzes by Frédéric Chopin
Compositions in A-flat major
1847 compositions
Music with dedications

pl:Walce op. 64 (Chopin)